Lucanus laminifer is a species of beetles of the family Lucanidae.

Description
Males show two long mandibles with small teeth at the inner side. The head bears a median and two lateral processes. Elytra are black or dark brown, smooth and shining.

Distribution
This species occurs in India, China and Thailand. They prefer forests at high elevations.

References

 Biolib

External links
 Malaeng

laminifer
Insects of India
Insects of China
Beetles described in 1890